Karen Robards (born August 24, 1954, in Louisville, Kentucky) is a best-selling author of over fifty novels.  After first gaining recognition for her historical romances, Robards became one of the first historical romance novelists to successfully make the switch to contemporary romantic suspense.  Her work has been translated into seventeen languages, and has won multiple awards.

Biography

Early years
Karen Robards sold her first story in 1973.  As a teenager working part-time for her orthodontist father, Robards saw a Reader's Digest solicitation for funny anecdotes.  She quickly penned and submitted a two-paragraph story.  Several weeks later she received a check for $100, and her entry was featured in the December 1973 Reader's Digest.

Her first attempts at writing a novel came while she was attending the University of Kentucky taking a graduate-level creative writing class, when the professor challenged each student to write 50 pages that could be published.  After researching what types of books were selling well, Robards chose to write a historical romance, not realizing that she would be required to read her work aloud to the class.  Although her professor and classmates laughed at her choice of subject matter, those 50 pages became the basis for her first book, Island Flame.  This debut novel was published in 1981, when Robards was in her early 20s.

Career
At the time that Robards's debut novel was published, the typical paperback historical romance novel had a shelf life of only three weeks.  After three weeks, her novel was no longer available on bookstore shelves, and her publisher was reluctant to purchase any further work without seeing the sales figures for the current book.  Undeterred, Robards dropped out of law school to pursue her writing career.  To pay her bills, she took a job in an orthodontic clinic, writing a new novel in the ladies' room at the clinic while on her lunch break.   She finished this second book, the contemporary romantic suspense To Love a Man, in three months.  The book sold quickly to a different publisher and became the true launchpad for her writing career.

Within the next several years, Robards had three additional historical romances published, including Sea Fire, the sequel to Island Flame, before To Love a Man was officially released.  After the publication of To Love a Man, Robards's new publisher contracted her to write two novels per year, one a historical romance and the other contemporary romantic suspense.  In the late 1980s and early 1990s, however, publishers began to fear that the contemporary romance market was "dead", and Robards was asked to write only historicals.  She switched publishers in the early 1990s, moving to Dell, and convinced them to take a chance on a new contemporary romance.  That novel, One Summer, was Robards' first hardcover contemporary novel, and its success convinced Dell to ask Robards to concentrate on her contemporary novels.  Her novels have been translated into eleven languages.

According to Romantic Times Magazine, "Robards has a true flair for characterization and excels at adding large doses of humor to the spicy mix."  She has won a Romantic Times Career Achievement Award, six Affaire de Coeur Silver Pen awards for favorite romance novelist, along with multiple other awards for her novels.

Robards lives in her hometown, Louisville, Kentucky, with her husband, Doug Robards, and their three sons, Jack, Chris, and Peter.  Her parents, three brothers, and sister live nearby.

Bibliography

Historical Romance

Pirate Series
Island Flame, 1981
Sea Fire, 1982

Banning Sisters Series
Scandalous, 2001
Irresistible, 2002
Shameless, 2010

Historical Romance Novels, by publication date
Island Flame, 1981
Sea Fire, 1982
Forbidden Love, 1983
Amanda Rose, 1984
Dark Torment, 1985
Loving Julia, 1986
Desire in the Sun, 1988
Tiger's Eye, 1989
Morning Song, 1990
Green Eyes, 1991
This Side of Heaven, 1991
Nobody's Angel, 1992
the enigma of the moon,1997
Scandalous, 2001
Irresistible, 2002
Shameless, 2010
The Black Swan of Paris, 2020

Thriller / Romantic Suspense

Jessica Ford Series
Pursuit, 2009
Justice, 2011

Dr. Charlotte Stone Series
The Last Victim, 2012
The Last Kiss Goodbye, 2013
Her Last Whisper, 2014
The Last Time I Saw Her, 2015

The Guardian Series
The Ultimatum, 2017
The Moscow Deception, 2018
The Fifth Doctrine, 2019

Thriller / Romantic Suspense Novels, by publication date
To Love a Man, 1985
Wild Orchids, 1986
Night Magic, 1987
One Summer, 1993
Maggy's Child, 1994
Walking After Midnight, 1995
Hunter's Moon, 1996
Heartbreaker, 1997
The Senator's Wife, 1998
The Midnight Hour, 1999
Ghost Moon, 2000
Paradise County, 2000
To Trust a Stranger, 2001
Manna From Heaven, 2001 (in anthology Wait Until Dark)
Whispers at Midnight, 2002
Beachcomber, 2003
Bait, 2004
Superstition, 2005
Vanished, 2006
Obsession, 2007
Guilty, 2008
Pursuit (Jessica Ford #1), 2009
Shattered, 2010
Justice (Jessica Ford #2), 2011
Sleepwalker, 2011
The Last Victim (Dr. Charlotte Stone #1), 2012
Shiver, 2012
The Last Kiss Goodbye (Dr. Charlotte Stone #2), 2013
Hunted, 2014
Her Last Whisper (Dr. Charlotte Stone #3), 2014
Hush, 2015
The Last Time I Saw Her (Dr. Charlotte Stone #4), 2015
Darkness, 2016
The Ultimatum, 2017
The Moscow Deception, 2018
The Fifth Doctrine, 2019

Anthology
Wait Until Dark (2001) (with Linda Anderson, Andrea Kane and Mariah Stewart)

See also
List of romantic novelists

References

External links
Karen Robards Official Website
List of books
Book reviews for Karen Robards' books

American romantic fiction writers
1957 births
Living people
Writers from Louisville, Kentucky
Kentucky women writers
21st-century American women